Gymnopilus fulviconicus is a species of mushroom in the family Hymenogastraceae.

See also

List of Gymnopilus species

External links
Gymnopilus fulviconicus at Index Fungorum

fulviconicus
Taxa named by William Alphonso Murrill